Elephant Research Foundation, first known as Elephant Interest Group, was a non-profit organization established by evolutionary biologist and elephant specialist Professor Jeheskel Shoshani in 1977, and closed down in 2017.

External links
Open Access Online digital version of Elephant, Wayne State University

References

Wayne State University faculty
Elephants
Foundations based in the United States
2017 disestablishments
1977 establishments in Michigan